The tables below compare general and technical information for some notable active microblogging services, and also social network services that have status updates.

General information

Features 
An overview of integral features. Extras may be provided by third party applications/services, but are not listed here.

Posting and reading 
Communication methods supported by the services. Extras may be provided by third party applications/services, but are not listed here.

See also 
 Microblogging
 OpenMicroBlogging
 Microblogging in China

References 

Microblogging services
Microblogging